Daredevil Falls is a water ride located in Dollywood, consisting of a pipe-like tunnel and a 60 degree drop.

History
The ride opened in April 1998 as a replacement of the old Flooded Mine attraction like the one at the sister park to Dollywood, Silver Dollar City , and was manufactured by Hopkins Rides of Contoocook, New Hampshire.

Queue 
The ride is set in a community called Lost River which is a logging community that takes the riders into an abandoned saw mill

Ride 
Riders board on a log themed car and go into a pipe.  As the vehicle enter the pipe, there's a fluttering noise and red eyes glowing. Riders leave the pipe and there is a bear wrecking a tent.  The vehicle makes a sharp turn and goes up a steep lift hill. Once on top, there is a saw coming towards the riders which then turns to the 60 degree drop and then take a sharp turn and pull into the station.

References

Dollywood
Water rides